Murray Ranger (born 18 April 1984) is a South African former cricketer. He played in 26 first-class, 24 List A, and 2 Twenty20 matches from 2004 to 2010.

References

External links
 

1984 births
Living people
South African cricketers
Border cricketers
Warriors cricketers
People from Stutterheim
Cricketers from the Eastern Cape